Theodor von Brand (born September 22, 1899 in Ortenberg, Baden-Württemberg; died July 19, 1978 in Bethesda, Maryland), full name Theodor Kurt Freiherr von Brand zu Neidstein, was a German American parasitologist.

Theodor von Brand is a descendant of the German noble family von Brand. His mother Diana von Brandt was a née Freiin von Hirsch from a Jewish German noble family.

He studied zoology and medicine and attained a doctorate in both sciences. He was an assistant of Ernst Weinland at the University of Erlangen-Nuremberg and went to the Bernhard Nocht Institute for Tropical Medicine in 1929. Because of his views opposing the National-Socialist-Party and due to maternal Jewish descent, he was forced to leave the institute in 1933 and went to Copenhagen. In 1935 he immigrated into the USA. He was among the first scientists making biochemical experiments with parasites at the Johns Hopkins University. 1947 he became leader of a department at the National Institutes of Health in Bethesda, Maryland.

He is an initial researcher of the biochemistry and metabolism of parasites of the groups of helminths and protozoa.

In 1978 he was honoured with the Robert Koch Medal.

His son Theodor P. von Brand (1926–2004) became a renowned administrative law judge in the USA.

Publications 
 Biochemistry of Parasites, Academic Press 1966, 2. Edition 1973
 Chemical physiology of endoparasitic animals, Academic Press 1952
 Biochemistry and physiology of endoparasites, North Holland/Elsevier 1979

Sources 
 Obituary in the Zeitschrift für Parasitenkunde, Volume 58, 1978, S. 1
 Geschichte des Bernhard Nocht Instituts (History of the Bernhard Nocht Institute for Tropical Medicine) (PDF)

External links 
 Images of Theodor von Brand in the History of Medicine (IHM)

References 

1899 births
1978 deaths
Barons of Germany
20th-century German zoologists
German parasitologists
Jewish emigrants from Nazi Germany to the United States
Von Brand, Theodor
Academic staff of the University of Erlangen-Nuremberg
Von Brand, Theodor
Presidents of the American Society of Parasitologists